The South Euboean Gulf (Notios Evvoïkos Kolpos) is a gulf in Central Greece, between the island of Euboea and the Greek mainland (Boeotia and Attica). With a total length of approximately 50 km and a width of 10 to 20 km, it stretches nearly diagonally from northwest to southeast, from the Euripus Strait, which connects it to the North Euboean Gulf, to the Petalies Gulf near Agia Marina in the south.

Islands
Petalioi (largest islands:Megalonisos, Chersonisi), Kavaliani, Stouronisi

Bays by the gulf
Agion Apolstolon Bay, south
Oropos Bay, southwest
Aliveri Bay, north
Boufalo Bay, northeast
Almyropotamos Bay, northeast

Places by the gulf
Sessi Beach, south
Varnavas Beach, south
Kalamos Beach, southwest
Nea Palatia, southwest
Skala Oropou, southwest
Chalkoutsi, southwest
Pigadaki, southwest
Dilessi, west
Paralia Achlidas, west
Faros, west
Chalkida, northwest
Eretria, northwest
Amarynthos, north
Aliveri, north
Panagia, northeast

Landforms of Attica
Euboea
Gulfs of Greece
Gulfs of the Aegean Sea
Landforms of East Attica
Landforms of Central Greece
Landforms of Euboea (regional unit)